Halson Vashon Eagleson Jr. (March 14, 1903 – September 23, 1992) was an American physicist and professor, and the fifth African American person to receive a PhD in physics in the United States. He was also the first African American person to receive a PhD in physics from Indiana University. Eagleson's research focused on acoustics and the behavior of sound.

Early life and family 
Halson V. Eagleson Jr., was born on March 14, 1903, in Bloomington, Indiana. He was one of six children born to Halson Vashon Eagleson, Sr. (1851–1921), who had been born into slavery and moved to Bloomington in the 1880s, and Eliza Ann Loggins, who was Eagleson's second wife and mother to his four youngest children. Eagleson, Sr., operated Eagleson Shaving Parlors in Bloomington and was a well-known barber in the Bloomington area. The Eagleson family was prominent in the Bloomington and Indiana University communities, and five of six of Eagleson, Sr.'s, children attended the university. Halson Eagleson Jr.'s, brother Preston Eagleson (1876–1911) became the first African American intercollegiate athlete at Indiana University, the second Black student to receive a degree, and the first Black student to earn a master's degree from the university. Preston's son, Wilson Vashon Marshall, later married Frances Marshall Eagleson, who was the first Black woman graduate from Indiana University. Their son, Wilson V. Eagleson, became a decorated United States Army Air Force officer and combat fighter pilot with the 332nd Fighter Group's 99th Fighter Squadron, best known as the Tuskegee Airmen.

In February 2022, the city of Bloomington changed the name of the north–south street that cuts through the Indiana University campus to Eagleson Avenue, honoring the Eagleson family. The street had previously been named Jordan Avenue, after David Starr Jordan, a former president of the university who had been a proponent of eugenics.

Education 
Eagleson attended primary and secondary schools in the Bloomington area, and there he first developed an interest in physics and music. He then went on to attend Indiana University, where he received his bachelor's degree in 1926. He remained at the university for his graduate studies, completing his master's degree in 1931 and his PhD in 1939. His thesis, publishing in 1939, was titled "The influence of certain atmospheric conditions upon sound transmission." Upon receiving his doctorate he became the first African American person in the history of the university to earn the degree in physics, and the fifth African American person in the country to receive a PhD in physics. Eagleson was proceeded by Hubert Mack Thaxton (PhD 1938, University of Wisconsin-Madison), and received his degree the same year Herman Branson also graduated with a PhD, from University of Cincinnati.

As a student, Eagleson played in dance and string bands to help finance his tuition. He was the first African American student to be elected to Sigma Xi, the honorary science society. He was also the first African American person at the university to earn an "I" letter in band. However, in 1922 as Eagleson was preparing to receive the "I," he was kidnapped by white students affiliated with the Ku Klux Klan who attempted to prevent him from performing at a Purdue game and earning the letter. Shortly before leaving to play in the Indiana-Purdue game in Lafayette, Indiana, three white students kidnapped Eagleson and took him to Spencer, Indiana, causing him to miss the bus to the game. Eagleson was eventually found and his kidnappers were brought to trial, but the all-white jury did not charge any of the students. Despite this violent act against him, Eagleson went on to receive the "I" letter in band for his musical achievements.

Career 
In 1927, while still pursuing his graduate studies, Eagleson began working as an instructor in mathematics and physics at Morehouse College. There, he also served as the college's band director.

He later was appointed professor of physics and head of the Department of Physics in 1940 in a joint appointment at Morehouse College and Clark College (now Clark Atlanta University). In 1947, he became professor of physics at Howard University and served there for 24 years. For three years he served as chairman of the Department of Physics at Howard. At Howard, he taught undergraduate and graduate courses, including an introductory physics course, and carried out research on acoustics.

After his retirement from Howard, Eagleson worked as a part-time physics teacher at the University of Maryland and at the University of the District of Columbia until 1989. That year, however, he suffered a stroke and retired permanently from teaching.

In addition to his tenured teaching appointments, he worked as a professor, assistant director, and staff member at National Science Foundation summer institutes in Georgia, Alabama, Louisiana, Texas, Maryland, North Carolina, and South Carolina. He also worked more broadly as an advisor to the NSF.

Outside of his teaching duties, he also was a consultant for the Environmental Protection Agency on noise pollution, and a member of an advisory group that evaluated scientific instruments developed by Bell Labs. He was also known for training many of the radiological monitors in the Washington, D.C. area.

He participated in numerous professional organizations throughout his career, and in 1948 he served as president of the National Institute of Science, one of the oldest science organizations serving historically Black colleges and universities.

Legacy 
In 1972, the first formal meeting of African-American physicists was held at Fisk University in Nashville, Tennessee, in an event called the Day of Scientific Lectures and Seminars (DOSLAS). This first meeting was organized to honor the work of Eagleson, John McNeile Hunter, and Donald A. Edwards. About 40 physicists attended this meeting, and it was the impetus for the creation of the National Society of Black Physicists, which was formally established in 1977.

Select publications 
 "Physics activities examinations in large classes," The Physics Teacher, 1979
 "Identification of Musical Instruments When Heard Directly and over a Public‐Address System," Journal of the Acoustical Society of America, 1947 (with Oran W. Eagleson)
 "An Experimental Method for Determining Coefficients of Sliding Friction," American Journal of Physics, 1945
 "The Influence of Certain Atmospheric Conditions upon Sound Transmission at Short Ranges," Journal of the Acoustical Society of America, 1941
 "An Improved Tube for Producing Anomalous Dispersion of Sodium Vapor," Review of Scientific Instruments, 1936
 "The  Effect of Humidity on the Reverberation Period of a Room," Indiana Academy of Science Proceedings, 1930

Awards 
 Distinguished service citation from the American Association of Physics Teachers (1974)
 Silver Beaver award of the Boy Scouts of America
 First recipient of the National Physics Fellow's Award

Personal life 
Eagleson was married twice. His first wife, Eula Strong, died in childbirth. He later married Helen B. Clark and they had two children.

Outside of his teaching career and professional life, Eagleson was active in religious communities, as a member of the Mount Carmel Baptist Church in Washington, D.C., the Gideons International group, and the National Capital Area Council of Churches. He was also a member of the Anglers All group, a fishing club. He was fluent in Spanish, French, and German, and played numerous instruments including the piano, saxophone, clarinet, and violin.

References

External links 
 Oral history interview with Halson V. Eagleson, conducted by Fisk University
 Article: "The Eaglesons: A Legendary Black Family" in Bloom Magazine

American bandleaders
1903 births
1992 deaths
Indiana University alumni
Scientists from Indiana
Acousticians
Clark Atlanta University faculty
Howard University faculty
Morehouse College faculty
University System of Maryland faculty
University of the District of Columbia faculty
People from Bloomington, Indiana
African-American physicists
20th-century American physicists
University and college band directors